Casey Stengel a public sculpture by American artist, Rhoda Sherbell, is located on the Indiana University-Purdue University Indianapolis campus, which is near downtown Indianapolis, Indiana. The sculpture can be found in the courtyard of the University Place Hotel. Installed in 2000, the sculpture was cast in bronze with a height of 43 inches.

Description
Casey Stengel depicts the legendary baseball player cast in bronze by Rhoda Sherbell. Located in the courtyard of University Place,  the sculpture stands 43" tall facing north. He is standing with his hands on his hips and head forward with a baseball cap. There is a baseball on the foot of the base lying next the player's left foot. Stengel is wearing his baseball uniform with the number 23 engraved on the back side. His age is shown through the wrinkles engraved on his face as well as his posture.

The sculpture is located next to the National Art Museum of Sport in the courtyard of University Place. It is based on the legendary baseball player and later manager of the New York Yankees and Mets.

Artist
Rhoda Sherbell is best known for sculpting historical figures such as Casey Stengel as public sculptures along with Portrait Bust-Sculpture, Portrait-Full Length, Portrait, Society/Celebrity/Notables, Sport Figure/Genre. Her chosen medium is clay, which she casts in bronze. Along with displaying work in museums, she also has work in the Baseball Hall of Fame, Cooperstown, New York Sherbell has received nineteen solo museum and gallery exhibitions along with more than fifty awards, including those from the American Academy and Institute of Arts and Letters, the Ford Foundation, the Louis Comfort Tiffany Foundation, the Pennsylvania Academy of Fine Arts and the National Sculpture Society (gold medal). Sherbell now lives in Long Island and her sculptures are found in museums including the National Museum of Art, the National Portrait Gallery-Smithsonian Institution, Washington, DC, Baseball Hall of Fame, Cooperstown, NY, Brooklyn Museum, NY, and the National Museum of Sport, New York, NY.

References

Outdoor sculptures in Indianapolis
Indiana University – Purdue University Indianapolis Public Art Collection
1965 sculptures
Bronze sculptures in Indiana
Statues in Indianapolis
Sculptures of men in Indiana